The Lorentz factor or Lorentz term is a quantity expressing how much the measurements of time, length, and other physical properties change for an object while that object is moving. The expression appears in several equations in special relativity, and it arises in derivations of the Lorentz transformations. The name originates from its earlier appearance in Lorentzian electrodynamics – named after the Dutch physicist Hendrik Lorentz.

It is generally denoted  (the Greek lowercase letter gamma).

Definition
The Lorentz factor  is defined as
,
where:
v is the relative velocity between inertial reference frames,
c is the speed of light in vacuum,
 is the ratio of v to c,
t is coordinate time,
 is the proper time for an observer (measuring time intervals in the observer's own frame).

This is the most frequently used form in practice, though not the only one (see below for alternative forms).

To complement the definition, some authors define the reciprocal

see velocity addition formula.

Occurrence
Following is a list of formulae from Special relativity which use  as a shorthand:
 The Lorentz transformation: The simplest case is a boost in the x-direction (more general forms including arbitrary directions and rotations not listed here), which describes how spacetime coordinates change from one inertial frame using coordinates (x, y, z, t) to another (x, y, z, t) with relative velocity v: 
Corollaries of the above transformations are the results:
 Time dilation: The time (∆t) between two ticks as measured in the frame in which the clock is moving, is longer than the time (∆t) between these ticks as measured in the rest frame of the clock: 
 Length contraction: The length (∆x) of an object as measured in the frame in which it is moving, is shorter than its length (∆x) in its own rest frame: 

Applying conservation of momentum and energy leads to these results:
 Relativistic momentum: The relativistic momentum relation takes the same form as for classical momentum, but using the above relativistic mass: 

Numerical values 

In the table below, the left-hand column shows speeds as different fractions of the speed of light (i.e. in units of c). The middle column shows the corresponding Lorentz factor, the final is the reciprocal. Values in bold are exact.

Alternative representations

There are other ways to write the factor. Above, velocity v was used, but related variables such as momentum and rapidity may also be convenient.

Momentum
Solving the previous relativistic momentum equation for  leads to
.
This form is rarely used, although it does appear in the Maxwell–Jüttner distribution.

Rapidity
Applying the definition of rapidity as the hyperbolic angle :

Using the property of Lorentz transformation, it can be shown that rapidity is additive, a useful property that velocity does not have. Thus the rapidity parameter forms a one-parameter group, a foundation for physical models.

Series expansion (velocity)
The Lorentz factor has the Maclaurin series:

which is a special case of a binomial series.

The approximation  ≈ 1 +  2 may be used to calculate relativistic effects at low speeds.

The truncated versions of this series also allow physicists to prove that special relativity reduces to Newtonian mechanics at low speeds. For example, in special relativity, the following two equations hold:

For  ≈ 1 and  ≈ 1 +  2, respectively, these reduce to their Newtonian equivalents:

The Lorentz factor equation can also be inverted to yield

This has an asymptotic form
.

The first two terms are occasionally used to quickly calculate velocities from large  values.

Applications in astronomy
The standard model of long-duration gamma-ray bursts (GRBs) holds that these explosions are ultra-relativistic (initial  greater than approximately 100), which is invoked to explain the so-called "compactness" problem: absent this ultra-relativistic expansion, the ejecta would be optically thick to pair production at typical peak spectral energies of a few 100 keV, whereas the prompt emission is observed to be non-thermal.

Subatomic particles called muons travel at a speed such that they have a relatively high Lorentz factor and therefore experience extreme time dilation. However, it has been found that ~10% of muons are still detected on the surface, thereby proving that to be detectable they have had their decay rates slow down relative to our inertial frame of reference.

See also
Inertial frame of reference
Pseudorapidity
Proper velocity

References

External links

Doppler effects
Equations
Minkowski spacetime
Special relativity
Hendrik Lorentz